A thrift institution is a financial institution that obtains the majority of its funds from the savings of the public. The term can include several cooperative banking models;
Savings and loan association
Mutual savings bank
Credit union